Balkrishna Khanderao Shukla  is an Indian Politician and a member of the Gujarat Legislative Assembly from Raopura  assembly constituency in Vadodara. He was a Member of Parliament of the 15th Lok Sabha of India, from 2009 to 2014. Shukla represented the Vadodara constituency of Gujarat and is a member of the Bharatiya Janata Party political party.

Early life and education
Balkrishna Shukla was born in Vadodara, Gujarat. He holds a Bachelor of Science degree and also has MBA in HR.

Political career
Balkrishna Shukla, prior to contesting elections, was the Mayor of Vadodara. He later contested for Lok Sabha elections and became a member of the 15th Lok Sabha from Vadodara constituency. He is also member in several committees.

Posts Held

See also

15th Lok Sabha
Politics of India
Parliament of India
Government of India
Vadodara (Lok Sabha constituency)
Bharatiya Janata Party

References 

India MPs 2009–2014
1963 births
Mayors of places in Gujarat
Ahmedabad municipal councillors
Lok Sabha members from Gujarat
People from Vadodara
People from Vadodara district
Living people
Bharatiya Janata Party politicians from Gujarat